The George R. Mann Building, also known as the Adkins Building, is a historic commercial building at 115 East 5th Street in Little Rock, Arkansas. Built in 1906 to a design by local architect George R. Mann, it is an important local example of Beaux Arts architecture, and served as the site of Mann's office until 1912. It also served as an office for other notable Little Rock professionals such as Dr. Frank Visonhaler, Dr. E. R. Dibrell and Dr. M. E. McCaskilI. Despite the building's comparatively modest scale, it has a monumental-appearing facade, with two-story fluted columns set on paneled stone posts, with angled Ionic capitals supporting a heavily carved entablature. A line of dentil moulding separates that from a projecting modillioned cornice topped by a series of cartouches, with a recessed parapet behind.

The building was listed on the National Register of Historic Places in 1983.

See also
National Register of Historic Places listings in Little Rock, Arkansas

References

Office buildings on the National Register of Historic Places in Arkansas
Beaux-Arts architecture in Arkansas
Buildings and structures in Little Rock, Arkansas
National Register of Historic Places in Little Rock, Arkansas
Commercial buildings completed in 1906
1906 establishments in Arkansas